Bruno Iglesias Lois (born 1 May 2003) is a Spanish footballer who plays as a midfielder for Spanish club Real Madrid Castilla.

Club career

Early career
Born in Salamanca, Spain, Iglesias played for local side Santa Marta between 2008 and 2015.

Real Madrid
After interest from Spanish sides Barcelona and Atlético Madrid, as well as English side Manchester City, Iglesias joined Real Madrid in 2015. He progressed through the youth ranks at Los Blancos, and has occasionally trained with the first team since 2019.

In October 2020, he was named among the 60 best young talents in the world by English newspaper The Guardian, and is considered one of the top youth prospects in the Real Madrid academy.

In 2021, he signed a two-year contract extension.

In 2022, he was promoted to reserves team in Primera Federación, but in January 2023, having struggled with Castilla, he was demoted to second reserves team Real Madrid, RSC Internacional in Tercera Federación.

International career
Iglesias has represented Spain at under-16 and under-17 level.

Personal life
In 2020, Iglesias became a member of fellow Spaniard Juan Mata's charity, Common Goal, and pledged to donate 1% of his wage to the COVID-19 Response Fund. He is the youngest member of the charity.

Career statistics

Club

Honours 

 Real Madrid Juvenil A

 UEFA Youth League: 2019–20

References

External links
 Real Madrid profile
 
 
 

2003 births
Living people
Sportspeople from Salamanca
Spanish footballers
Spain youth international footballers
Association football midfielders
Real Madrid CF players
21st-century Spanish people